Laguna de la Restinga is a national park on the Isla Margarita, Nueva Esparta state, Venezuela.
The main part of the park is a large salt lagoon, rich in fish and birdlife.  It is on the Ramsar list of wetlands of international importance, and is classified as an Important Bird Area.

Location

The park lies between the eastern part of Margarita island and the Macanao Peninsula, which are connected only by a thin bar, or strip of land.
The shallow lagoon is separated from the sea to the north by a bar of sand and sea shells.
To the south a broad channel connects the lagoon with the sea.
The west coast is rocky, with cliffs and small beaches.

Flora

The park is in Venezuelan Dry Forest biogeographical province.
The sandbar has buttonwood mangrove (Conocarpus erectus) and various types of grass.
The land surrounding the saltwater is covered by xerophytes.
The semi-desert tropical climate supports thornwood and shrub forest.

Fauna

Oysters cling to the mangrove roots.
Birds that feed in the lagoon include scarlet ibis, red-legged tinamous, frigatebirds, blue herons, green herons, great egrets, ground doves, cormorants and flamingos.
Three endemic land species are present: the deer Odocoileus carriacou margaritae, the rabbit Sylvilagus floridanus margaritae and the snake Leptotyphlops albifrons margaritae.

Tourism

Tourists can reach the embarkation pier in the lagoon by bus from Porlamar.
Five seat motorboats from there take visitors for a trip through the interconnecting channels through the mangroves, some with romantic names like Mi Dulce Amor (My Sweet Love) or Túnel de los Enamorados (Lovers Tunnel).
The boats take visitors to an open-air shack serving fresh fried fish on a shell beach.

Gallery

References

Citations

Sources

National parks of Venezuela
Margarita Island
Geography of Nueva Esparta
Important Bird Areas of Venezuela
Marine reserves
Ramsar sites in Venezuela
Protected areas established in 1974
1974 establishments in Venezuela
Tourist attractions in Nueva Esparta